Ali Baba and the Seven Dwarfs is a 2015 Turkish action film directed by Cem Yılmaz.

Cast 
 Cem Yılmaz - Ali Senay
 Irina Ivkina  - Veronica
  - Ilber
 Zafer Algöz - Kenan Memedov
 Can Yılmaz - İsmail Bey
  - Mitko Tasev
 Fevzi Gökçe - Sadık
  - Tayanç Pakça

References

External links 

2015 action comedy films
Films shot in Bulgaria
Turkish action comedy films
2010s Turkish-language films
2015 comedy films